James Yardley (16 April 1903 – 1959) was a Scottish professional footballer, best known as a player for Luton Town.

Playing career
Yardley signed for Luton Town from Clapton Orient during the 1926–27 season, but failed to score before the season ended. During 1927–28, his first full season with the club, Yardley scored 23 league goals. He continued his good form the next season, scoring 19. He continued his good form until 1932, when he was surprisingly sold to Charlton Athletic.

In 1936, now well into his 30s, he returned to Scotland where he scored 38 top flight Scottish Football League goals over three seasons with Third Lanark and Ayr United, and was selected for the Glasgow FA's annual challenge match against Sheffield in November 1936. He moved on to Morton, but the outbreak of World War II a short time later brought his career to an end.

References

Association football forwards
Scottish footballers
English Football League players
Scottish Football League players
Scottish Junior Football Association players
Leyton Orient F.C. players
Luton Town F.C. players
Charlton Athletic F.C. players
Millwall F.C. players
1903 births
1959 deaths
Third Lanark A.C. players
Ayr United F.C. players
Greenock Morton F.C. players
Wishaw Juniors F.C. players
Date of death missing
Sportspeople from Wishaw
Footballers from North Lanarkshire